Cardea may refer to:
 Cardea, an ancient Roman goddess of the door-hinge.
 Cardea (DRM), a codename for Microsoft Windows Media DRM
 Cardea, the precursor group to San Francisco lesbian-feminist BDSM organization Samois
 Cardea, an atoll of the former micronation the Republic of Minerva
 Cardea, the marketing name given to a large housing development at Stanground, a suburb of Peterborough
 Caryatis Cardea, former editor of the journal Sinister Wisdom
 Frank Cardea, writer on the television series NCIS